Artur Jorge Marques Amorim (born 14 August 1994), known as Artur Jorge, is a Portuguese professional footballer who plays for Emirati club Al Bataeh Club as a central defender.

Formed at Braga, he made 94 Primeira Liga appearances, also representing Vitória de Setúbal and Moreirense. He also played top-flight football in Belgium, Romania, Cyprus and the United Arab Emirates.

Club career

Braga
Born in Braga, Artur Jorge joined local S.C. Braga's youth system at the age of 10. He started playing as a senior with the B team, going on to spend several seasons with them in the Segunda Liga. Additionally, during 2014–15, he was loaned to Vilaverdense F.C. and S.C. Freamunde.

Artur Jorge made both his main squad and Primeira Liga debut on 19 September 2016, coming on as a 71st-minute substitute for the injured André Pinto in a 3–1 away loss against S.L. Benfica. He contributed a further 15 starts until the end of the season, in a fifth-place finish; on 3 December he was sent off after 35 minutes for conceding a penalty kick in a 1–0 defeat at FC Porto with a foul on André Silva, who missed the attempt. He added four appearances in the Taça da Liga, including a start in the 1–0 final loss to Moreirense F.C. on 29 January 2017.

On 15 August 2017, after renewing his contract for one year and less than one month on loan at Royal Excel Mouscron, Artur Jorge agreed to a season-long loan deal with Romanian club FCSB. His debut came three days later in an away match against SC Juventus București, scoring an own goal after just 13 seconds in an eventual 2–1 win.

Vitória Setúbal
Artur Jorge returned to his country and its top division on 13 June 2018, joining Vitória F.C. on a three-year contract. He started in all but one of his 30 appearances in his second season, but his team were relegated to the third tier due to irregularities; on 3 August, he scored the only goal at home to Moreirense to reach the League Cup group stage.

APOEL and Moreirense
In September 2020, Artur Jorge signed a two-year deal with APOEL FC of the Cypriot First Division. He cancelled this arrangement at the halfway point after a runners-up campaign, and signed a three-year deal with Moreirense back home. 

Artur Jorge scored the first top-flight goal of his career on 14 May 2022 as the season ended with a 4–1 home victory over F.C. Vizela, putting the Moreira de Cónegos team in the relegation play-offs.

Later career
Artur Jorge rescinded his contract with the relegated club and went back abroad on 31 July 2022, signing for Al Bataeh Club in the UAE Pro League.

Personal life
Artur Jorge's father, known by the same name, was also a footballer and a defender. He too played for Braga, and managed the club in two spells.

Career statistics

References

External links

1994 births
Living people
Sportspeople from Braga
Portuguese footballers
Association football defenders
Primeira Liga players
Liga Portugal 2 players
Campeonato de Portugal (league) players
S.C. Braga B players
Vilaverdense F.C. players
S.C. Freamunde players
S.C. Braga players
Vitória F.C. players
Moreirense F.C. players
Royal Excel Mouscron players
Liga I players
FC Steaua București players
Cypriot First Division players
APOEL FC players
UAE Pro League players
Al Bataeh Club players
Portuguese expatriate footballers
Expatriate footballers in Belgium
Expatriate footballers in Romania
Expatriate footballers in Cyprus
Expatriate footballers in the United Arab Emirates
Portuguese expatriate sportspeople in Belgium
Portuguese expatriate sportspeople in Romania
Portuguese expatriate sportspeople in Cyprus
Portuguese expatriate sportspeople in the United Arab Emirates